FASTER is a trans-Pacific submarine communications cable that went live during the last week of June 2016. The cable has a total length of approximately 11,629 km and a capacity of 60Tb/s.

The companies involved in the project include:
 Google
 KDDI
 SingTel
 China Telecom Global
 China Mobile International
 Global Transit Communications

FASTER has landings in:
 Bandon, Oregon, USA
 Chikura, Chiba, Japan
 Shima, Mie, Japan
 Tamsui, New Taipei City, Taiwan

See also
 List of international submarine communications cables
 Unity (cable system)

References

External links
 
 http://www.submarinecablemap.com/#/submarine-cable/faster

Submarine communications cables in the Pacific Ocean
Google
KDDI
2016 establishments in Oregon
2016 establishments in Japan
2016 establishments in Taiwan